Mitchelson may refer to:

Archibald Mitchelson (died 1945), British investment banker
Bonnie Mitchelson (born 1947), politician in Manitoba, Canada
Edwin Mitchelson (1846–1934), New Zealand politician and timber merchant
Gareth Mitchelson (born 1967), Scottish dancer
Joanne Mitchelson (born 1971), Tasmanian-born Artist
Marvin Mitchelson (1928–2004), American celebrity lawyer, pioneer of palimony
Richard Mitchelson Campbell (1897–1974), New Zealand economist, civil servant and diplomat

See also
Mitchell (disambiguation)
Mitchelstown